The Frangen Plateau occupies the easternmost part of the Danubian Plain (Bulgaria).

References

Plateaus of Bulgaria